The following highways are numbered 778:

United States